The International Racquetball Federation's 20th Racquetball World Championships were held in Guatemala City, Guatemala from November 26 to December 6. This is the first time Worlds have been in Guatemala, and the second consecutive time a Central American country has hosted the event after Costa Rica in 2018.

For the third straight Worlds, Mexico won gold, and this year it was Javier Mar and Rodrigo Montoya winning for their first time and the seventh overall for Mexico. It was Montoya's second world title, as he won men's singles in 2018. He joins American Todd O'Neill and Mexican Alvaro Beltran as the only men to win both singles and doubles at the World Championships. Mar and Montoya beat Bolivians Roland Keller and Conrrado Moscoso in the final, which was the first time Bolivia had reached the finals.

Tournament format
The 2021 World Championships used a two stage format with an initial group stage that was a round robin with the results used to seed players for a medal round.

Group stage

Pool A

Pool B

Pool C

Pool D

Medal round

References

Racquetball competitions